Patriotismo is a metro station on the Mexico City Metro. It is located in both the Cuauhtémoc and Miguel Hidalgo municipalities of Mexico City. It is part of the Metro Line 9.

Name and iconography
The station is named after Avenida Patriotismo which divides the Cuauhtémoc and Miguel Hidalgo boroughs. "Patriotismo" literally means patriotism, thus, the station logo depicts a Mexican flag.

When Line 9 was on its planning stage, the name for the station was Escandón, after Colonia Escandón, the neighborhood the station is located at, but it was later changed to Patriotismo.

General information
The station serves the Escandón, Hipódromo Condesa, and Condesa neighborhoods; it is located at the intersection of Benjamin Franklin Street and General Salvador Alvarado Street.The station has two exits on both sides of Benjamin Franklin street.  The station was opened on 29 August 1988.

Ridership
In 2019, the station registered an average of 18,160 users per day.

Exits
North: Eje 4 Sur Benjamin Franklin and General Salvador Alvarado street, Col. Hipódromo Condesa
South: Eje 4 Sur Benjamin Franklin and General Salvador Alvarado street, Colonia Escandón

Gallery

References

External links 
 
 

Patriotismo
Condesa
Mexico City Metro stations in Miguel Hidalgo, Mexico City
Railway stations opened in 1988
1988 establishments in Mexico
Mexico City Metro stations in Cuauhtémoc, Mexico City
Accessible Mexico City Metro stations